Pang Lijuan (born August 1962) is a Chinese educator and politician who is a member of the Standing Committee of the National People's Congress and a member of the Chinese Communist Party. She has also worked at Beijing Normal University, University of California, Berkeley, and Stanford University.

Early life
Pang was born in 1962, in Ninghai County, Zhejiang, China. Lijuan graduated with a Bachelor of Arts in childhood education in 1982, a master of philosophy from the University of Illinois at Urbana–Champaign in 1987 and a doctorate in psychology in 1991,  from the Beijing Normal University.

Career
Pang has worked at Beijing Normal University, University of California, Berkeley, and Stanford University. At Beijing Normal University she worked as Vice Director of the University Council, and as a professor. She worked at the Senior Behavior Scientific Research Center at Stanford University and at the Institute of Human Development at the University of California, Berkeley.

From Since 2003, Pang served as a member of the Standing Committee of the National People's Congress and during her tenure she served on the Education, Science, Culture and Health committee.

References

1962 births
Living people
21st-century Chinese politicians
Chinese women in politics
Members of the Standing Committee of the 10th National People's Congress
Members of the Standing Committee of the 11th National People's Congress
Members of the Standing Committee of the 12th National People's Congress
Members of the Standing Committee of the 13th National People's Congress